In Old California is a 1910 American silent Western film. It was the first film shot in Hollywood, California. It was directed by D. W. Griffith of the American Mutoscope and Biograph Company (then based in New York City). The film is a melodrama about the Mexican era of California.

Background
Director D. W. Griffith discovered the little village of Hollywood on his trips to California and decided to shoot there because of the beautiful scenery and friendly people. On May 6, 2004, a monument was erected at 1713 Vine Street, just north of Hollywood Boulevard. The monument was made by Hollywood Forever Cemetery, and the film which was once thought lost was screened at the Beverly Hills Film Festival. This was the first time the film had been seen by the public in 94 years. The film was scheduled for restoration, with the restored version to be premiered at a later date.

For years the first film thought shot in Hollywood was Cecil B. DeMille's feature film The Squaw Man (1914), which does hold the record of first feature film made in Hollywood. The discovery of Griffith's film made it the first film of any length shot in Hollywood.

Synopsis
This story starts some time before Mexican independence was proclaimed in California, which occurred in 1822. Perdita Lergnello, the pretty Spanish senorita, is beloved by Jr. Manuella, a wealthy young Spaniard, who has migrated to the new world in search of adventure. A man of fine qualities, he surrenders his claim upon the girl when he finds out that her heart has been given to Pedro Cortes, a handsome troubadour from the village. Of a poetic temperament, she yields to his plea and marries him.

Twenty years later, we see the result of her mistaken marriage to Cortes. Cortes has proven to be a worthless dipsomaniac and reprobate, spending his time and the money she earns at the tavern. The most unfortunate feature is that they have a son, now nearly nineteen years old. Perdita realizes that his father's example is not favorable to the boy's well-being, resolving to save him. At this time, California is in conflict, and Manuella, Perdita's former lover, is now the new Governor, so she appeals to him to provide a future for her son. The Governor takes the boy into his own company. Perdita's son displays characteristics similar to his father, including drunkenness and theft, accumulating in the robbing of his sleeping comrades-in-arms. Perdita has despatched a letter of thanks to the Governor, which he is reading as the drunken boy is brought before him. The tone of the letter induces Manuella to be more lenient with the boy in the hope that she might live in ignorance of his real nature.

However, later she writes that she is dying, and believing her son has made a name for himself, she asks to be allowed to see him before she dies. At this moment, the boy is brought before him again having been caught thieving. Manuella is thoroughly disgusted with the boy, but in order to have his mother die happy, he decorates him, making him appear before her as a hero. When she breathes her last breath the medals are torn from his breast and he is sent to prison where the punishment for the pain that he has inflicted.

See also
 List of American films of 1910

References

External links
 
 In Old California at the TCM database

1910 films
1910 Western (genre) films
1910 drama films
American black-and-white films
American silent short films
Biograph Company films
Films directed by D. W. Griffith
Films with screenplays by Stanner E.V. Taylor
Melodrama films
Silent American Western (genre) films
1910s American films
Silent American drama films
1910s English-language films

sv:Drömmen om det gamla Kalifornien